Martin John Weston (born 8 April 1959 in Worcester) is a retired professional cricketer who played for Worcestershire from 1979 to 1995.

External links
 
 

Worcestershire cricketers
Herefordshire cricketers
English cricketers
1959 births
Sportspeople from Worcester, England
Living people
20th-century English people